Bayfield County Courthouse is a historic courthouse in Washburn, Wisconsin. Construction on the courthouse began in 1894, two years after the county seat moved to Washburn and was completed in 1896. The courthouse cost $31,737 to build. The Neoclassical building features a domed cupola, a portico with Corinthian columns as its front entrance, and quoins at the corners. When first built, the courthouse had an extensive telephone system connecting each office; at the time, this was considered "one of the proudest achievements" of the new building.

The courthouse was added to the National Register of Historic Places on January 17, 1975.

References

Courthouses on the National Register of Historic Places in Wisconsin
Neoclassical architecture in Wisconsin
Government buildings completed in 1896
Buildings and structures in Bayfield County, Wisconsin
County courthouses in Wisconsin
National Register of Historic Places in Bayfield County, Wisconsin